Manitou Bathhouse or Manitou Spa is a historic building located along Fountain Creek in Manitou Springs, Colorado. Once used as a mineral water bathhouse or spa, the building is now used for stores and other businesses on the first floor. The second and third floors hold residential units. It is on the National Register of Historic Places. Located in the building is Adam's Mountain Cafe.

The Manitou Spa building is located near several natural mineral springs and within the building is the Soda Spring. The spa was the "town's social center" in the early 1900s.

The building, constructed in 1920 or 1921, served infirm and healthy people. One of the resources in the Save America's Treasures project, the hotel and spa resort building retains its original marble floors, bar and murals. Before it was renovated in 2005, it was vacant due to flooding and disrepair.

The original bathhouse was built in 1882 to 1883 and was torn down in 1923, or in 1921. Visitors to the bathhouse could bathe in a cool plunge pool, relax in hot mineral water baths, visit the physician or relax in one of the reading rooms.

Gallery

See also
 Manitou Springs Historic District
 List of Manitou Springs Historic District buildings

References

External links

Buildings and structures on the National Register of Historic Places in Colorado
Colorado State Register of Historic Properties
Manitou Springs, Colorado
National Register of Historic Places in El Paso County, Colorado